Sorna Bluff is a prominent rock bluff on the north side of Saratoga Table, overlooking the head of May Valley in the Forrestal Range, Pensacola Mountains. It was mapped by United States Geological Survey (USGS) from surveys and U.S. Navy air photos, 1956–66, and named by Advisory Committee on Antarctic Names (US-ACAN) for Lieutenant Commander Ronald E. Sorna, a U.S. Navy pilot on photographic flights in the Pensacola Mountains.

Cliffs of Queen Elizabeth Land